Gerald L. Young is an ecologist who has published and is best known for his work in human ecology. He is a professor of biology and environmental science and regional planning at Washington State University. and was past president (1988-1990) of the Society for Human Ecology. The Society for Human Ecology offers the Gerald L. Young book award.

Publications

Young, G. L. (Ed.) (1983). Origins of Human Ecology.  Hutchinson Ross Publishing Company, Stroudsburg, Pennsylvania.
Young, G. L. (Ed.) (1986). Human Ecology: A Gathering of Perspectives

Young, G. L. (1989). A Conceptual Framework for an Interdisciplinary Human Ecology. Acta Oecologiae Hominis, 1, 1–135.
Young, G.L. (1994). The case for a ’catholic’ ecology. Human Ecology Review 2, 310–319.
Young, G.L. (1996). Interaction as a concept basic to human ecology: An exploration and synthesis. Advances in Human Ecology 5, 157–211.
Young, G.L. (1998). Holism: Writ and riposte in ecology and human ecology. Advances in Human Ecology 7, 313–365.
Young, G.L. (1999). A piece of the main: Parts and wholes in human ecology. Advances in Human Ecology 8, 1–31.

Young, G. L., Steiner, F., Brooks, K. and Struckmeyer, K. (1994) Planning the built environment: Determining the regional context. In The Built Environment: A Creative Inquiry into Design and Planning (Tom J. Bartuska and Gerald L. Young, eds.). Crisp Publications, Menlo Park, California.

References 

American ecologists
Human ecologists